Gus Kuhn (17 October 1898 – 30 August 1966) was a successful British TT and motorcycle speedway rider during the 1920s and 1930s.

He was born in Birmingham, England, and served in the Royal Naval Air Service in World War I.

Speedway
Kuhn captained the Stamford Bridge team to victory in the 1929 Southern League Championship, and after Stamford Bridge closed in 1932, he spent nearly five years racing for the Wimbledon Dons. In 1937 he moved to the Wembley Lions and then Lea Bridge Speedway Team in 1938, where he was captain. He retired from speedway in 1939 after a season with the Southampton Saints.

"A wily master of track-craft, a brilliant mechanic, a darned hard man to get past (and not only because of his portly figure), and above all a thorough sportsman and a jolly good fellow". - Speedway News 16 May 1936

Kuhn made his first appearance for England during the first international test match against Australia (1930) and went on to have a number of international appearances throughout the decade.

Film appearance
The speedway scenes from the 1933 film Britannia of Billingsgate were shot at Hackney Wick Stadium and featured some of the leading riders in Britain at the time including Kuhn, Colin Watson, Arthur Warwick, Tom Farndon, Claude Rye and Ron Johnson.

Isle of Man TT
As a rider in the TT, Kuhn's greatest success came in the 1926 Isle of Man TT in the Junior TT division.
Results summary

Off track
In 1932 Kuhn founded Gus Kuhn Motors in Clapham Road, London. The company dealt in Triumphs, BSA and Nortons, its reputation for racing success was not to come until a few years later. After Kuhn's death in 1966, the Gus Kuhn name lived on, the firm now being run by his son-in-law, Vincent Davey. The team focused primarily on racing modifications to Norton Motorcycles and by 1969 they had won the British 500cc Championship, Castrol Championship, Duckhams Trophy, Grovewood Award and Redex Trophy. For a number of years, Norton racing kits and parts were produced for practically every part of the Norton. Over the years these racing machines supplied a number of notable riders including Mick Andrew, Charlie Sanby and Dave Potter.

Players cigarette cards
Kuhn is listed as number 25 of 50 in the 1930s Player's cigarette card collection.

References

External links
 Isle of Man TT Rider Biography
 Vintage Norton Commando Gallery
 Gus Kuhn website

1898 births
1966 deaths
British speedway riders
English motorcycle racers
Isle of Man TT riders
Wimbledon Dons riders
Wembley Lions riders
Sportspeople from Birmingham, West Midlands
Royal Naval Air Service personnel of World War I